Rocky Mount is a city in Edgecombe and Nash counties in the U.S. state of North Carolina. The city's population was 54,341 as of the 2020 census, making it the 20th-most populous city in North Carolina at the time. The city is 45 mi (72 km) east of Raleigh, the state capital.

It is the principal city of the Rocky Mount metropolitan area, often called the "Twin Counties", in the 2020 census, the population was 143,870. Rocky Mount is also an anchor city of the Rocky Mount-Wilson-Roanoke Rapids Combined Statistical Area in northeast North Carolina with a total population of 288,747 as of the 2020 census.

Incorporated in 1867, the community at the falls of the Tar River that became the city of Rocky Mount dates from the middle of the 1700s. Historically strong in rail transportation, textiles, and agriculture, the economy of Rocky Mount has diversified into biomedical pharmaceuticals, manufacturing, and logistics. Rocky Mount has also twice received the All-America City Award from the National Civic League in 1969 and 1999.

History

Beginnings
The region around the Tar River was continuously inhabited by indigenous people for 12,000 years before the first Europeans arrived, when it was home to the Tuscarora people. Europeans began settling the area after the Tuscarora War in the early 1700s. Like many other early settlements in colonial America, they settled along the fall line between the Piedmont and coastal plain, which is the point at which rivers become unnavigable sailing upstream and water flowing downstream can power a mill. The Falls of the Tar River Primitive Baptist Church was established in 1757, which still meets today, although its original building has since been replaced. Much of the community attended the church so that it served as an early form of record keeping and law enforcement with citations given for crimes.

19th century
A post office was established at the falls of the Tar River on March 22, 1816. At this point, the name "Rocky Mount" officially appears in documented history, undoubtedly referring to the rocky mound at the falls of the Tar River. The second cotton mill in North Carolina followed soon thereafter, Rocky Mount Mills, in 1818. Its proprietors were two entrepreneurs and Joel Battle, grandson of an original colonial settler to the area. Joel bought out the other proprietors before turning over the enterprise to his cousin James Smith Battle. The mill's spindles were initially operated by slaves until the 1850s and then worked exclusively by white women and girls. This female working arrangement lasted for the rest of the century.

It connected the area to major ports in Virginia to the north and the port of Wilmington to the south. The tracks first reached Rocky Mount on Christmas Eve in 1839. In 1840, a train of cars en route to Wilmington stopped in Rocky Mount to import some "Old Nash" for special toasts at opening festivities and from there the fame of Nash County apple brandy spread. The railroad exerted a powerful influence on the development of the town so that, in 1871, the county line moved from the Tar River to its present location in the center of the tracks. The Raleigh-Tarboro stage route also passed just below Rocky Mount (roughly where I-95 and U.S. 64 run today), and for a time was the logical debarking point for railroad travelers wishing to proceed east or west.

The surrounding region was raided in 1863 during the Civil War by Union troops under the command of Brigadier General Edward E. Potter. The mill, which supplied Confederate yarn and cloth, was burned down. The mill was rebuilt after the war ended. On February 19, 1867, the village outside the mill was incorporated as a town.

The latter half of the 19th century saw the tobacco industry take shape in the state. Adjacent to the sandy coastal plain, Rocky Mount was well situated to take advantage of the rapidly rising demand for brightleaf tobacco that grew best in the sandy soil. Tobacco also shaped the city's social life. Warehouses where tobacco was stored and marketed began hosting balls for the community in the 1880s that became known as "june germans" for the time of year and style of dance. June Germans eventually transformed into all-night dance parties and attracted musicians and socialites from miles around well into the 1900s. By the end of the 19th century, tobacco had surpassed King Cotton as the town's primary agricultural product.

20th century

The turn of the 20th century saw Rocky Mount become the northern headquarters of the Atlantic Coast Line Railroad and its major repair shops and yard facilities located to the town. With it came an influx of railroad employees. In 1900, Rocky Mount's population was around 3,000. On February 28, 1907, with a population around 7,500, Rocky Mount was officially incorporated as a city. A main railroad line, a well established cotton mill, and productive farmland for brightleaf tobacco were major contributors to the area's growth and prosperity over the next decades. A vibrant central business district arose. As in the rest of the South, though, racial segregation was imposed on the community leading to white suburbs largely on the west side of town, such as Villa Place and West Haven, and black neighborhoods largely on the east side of town, like Crosstown and Around the "Y" where jazz musician Thelonious Monk was born.

Several notable Civil Rights events occurred in Rocky Mount. In 1946, African American tobacco warehouse workers voted to organize in Rocky Mount as part of a broader nationwide movement known as Operation Dixie that led to voter registration and political action against segregation. On November 27, 1962, Martin Luther King Jr. gave a speech at Booker T. Washington High School wherein he used his famous refrain "I have a dream" a year before his better known delivery at the March on Washington. The city also had its own sanitation workers' strike in 1978 when government sanitation workers protested their black co-worker being wrongfully arrested leading to his acquittal in court and the city later apologizing.

 
After WWII, the city continued to grow and the 1950s and 1960s saw the city's economy diversify into banking, manufacturing, pharmaceuticals, and the headquarters of a fast food chain known as Hardee's. New educational facilities were also built including North Carolina Wesleyan College in 1956 and Nash Community College and Edgecombe Community College in 1968. In 1970, Rocky Mount received an All-America City Award. The 1970s also saw the consolidation of the city's hospitals under Nash General Hospital and the completion of Rocky Mount–Wilson Regional Airport.

Like much of the rest of America, the 1980s onward saw urban decay of the inner city. Rocky Mount's downtown deteriorated but new neighborhoods and shopping malls were built like Golden East Crossing, and the city's boundaries expanded. In 1996, the town of Battleboro to the north of the city was annexed. In 1999, the city won its second All-America City Award.

The fall of 1999 saw two hurricanes make landfall in eastern North Carolina. Floyd is especially memorable because most localized flooding happened quickly overnight and many residents were not aware of the flooding until the water came into their homes, requiring many to be rescued. As a result of the hurricane, the already saturated Tar River suffered the worst flooding in its recorded history, exceeding 500-year flood levels along its lower stretches, and many homes and businesses were destroyed.

21st century
The first decades of the 21st century have seen efforts to revitalize the historic downtown and projects to renovate buildings such as the train station and Douglas Block, or repurpose them like the Imperial Centre for Arts and Sciences. In 2007, Capitol Broadcasting Company bought Rocky Mount Mills and is in the process of turning it into a mixed-use campus of breweries, restaurants, lofts, and event space. There have also been major new community projects such as the  sports complex and  downtown event center. In 2019, CSX, the successor company of the Atlantic Coast Line Railroad, broke ground on a new intermodal cargo terminal that is expected to grow the local economy in the next decade.

Geography

Rocky Mount is located in northeastern North Carolina, at the fall line between the Atlantic Coastal Plain to the east and the Piedmont region to the west.

The Tar River passes through the city from west to east, crossing the fall line at Upper Falls and Little Falls and descending  within the city limits. The city boundaries straddle the line between Edgecombe and Nash counties, which follows the railroad tracks through the center of the city running north to south.

Neighborhoods

Historic Rocky Mount Mills Village

Situated near the Tar River, the Rocky Mount Mills Village grew in the late 19th and early 20th centuries as a small community of tenants working for the mill. Built between 1885 and 1940, each home is recognized by the National Register of Historic Places. Changes in industrialization eventually forced the closing of the mill, and this way of life came to an end. However, when the mill closed, the property remained intact. Though the property has been a rental for its entire existence, covenants are placed on the property to assure home ownership and owner occupancy and protect the historical integrity.

Climate
Rocky Mount has a humid subtropical climate (Köppen Cfa) characterized by cool, sometimes moderately cold winters, and hot, humid summers.

Demographics

2020 census

As of the 2020 United States census, there were 54,341 people, 22,260 households, and 14,334 families residing in the city.

2010 census
As of the census of 2010, 57,477 people, 23,097 households, and 14,639 families resided in the city. The population density was 1,312.6 inhabitants per square mile (606.7/km). The city had 26,953 housing units. The racial makeup of the city was 61.3% African American,  32.4% White, 0.6% Native American, 1.0% Asian, and 1.6% from two or more races. Hispanics or Latinos of any race were 3.7% of the population.

Of the 23,097 households, 27.3% had children under the age of 18 living with them, 35.7% were married couples living together, 22.9% had a female householder with no husband present, and 36.6% were not families. About 31.4% of all households were made up of individuals living alone, and 26.6% had someone living alone who was 65 years of age or older.  The average household size was 2.42 and the average family size was 3.04.

In the city, the population was distributed as 27.5% between the ages of 1 and 19, 6.4% from 20 to 24, 24% from 25 to 44, 27.9% from 45 to 64, and 14.2% who were 65 years of age or older.  The median age is 38.7 years. 45.8% of the population are males compared to 54.2% for females.

The median income for a household in the city was $37,059, and for a family was $39,929. The per capita income for the city was $21,779.  About 19.0% of the population is below the poverty line.

Religion
Rocky Mount's population is 40.3% religiously affiliated, below the state average of 48.9%. Christianity is the largest religion, with Baptists (13.3%) making up the largest religious group, followed by Pentecostals (4.5%) and Methodists (3.5%). Presbyterians (1.5%), Episcopalians (0.9%), and Catholics (0.8%) make up a significant amount of the Christian population as well. The remaining Christian population (15.2%) is affiliated with other churches. Islam (0.5%) is the second largest religion after Christianity.

Economy

The economy of the Rocky Mount metropolitan area, historically been dependent on textiles and agriculture, has diversified into pharmaceuticals and manufacturing. Located near the juncture of a number of highways and railway, distribution and logistics are important to local business. The area has a strong service sector and a number of financial and customer support centers are located here.

This has helped attract new companies to Rocky Mount seeking a skilled labor and a lower costs of living and doing business.

The metropolitan area was named in a 2020 study as the third-highest in the United States where manufacturing is thriving with a manufacturing output of $6.2 billion, or $42,270 per capita. Between 2014 and 2018, manufacturing grew in the Rocky Mount area by 11.8%, and there were 108% more manufacturing jobs than the national average.

In 2019, CSX Transportation began construction of a $200 million cargo terminal in Rocky Mount.

Largest employers
Below is a list of some of the largest employers in the metropolitan area as of 2018.

Shopping
Rocky Mount is a regional shopping destination with many big-box retailers and specialty shops located in the city. Rocky Mount's shopping centers are generally congregated along and around US 301 (Wesleyan Boulevard). Two examples are Golden East Crossing and Englewood Square.

In the downtown, the Douglas Block is a commercial area that was a former African American business district. Station Square is a shopping area located next to city hall and the train station.

Arts and culture

The city is home to multiple venues for the performing arts. The Imperial Centre for the Arts and Sciences hosts the Maria V. Howard Arts Center, a Children's Museum and Science Center, and a community theater. The Dunn Center for the Performing Arts at Wesleyan College regularly has college arts performances and touring acts, and is also the home of the Tar River Orchestra and Chorus. Most recently, the Rocky Mount Event Center opened in downtown with space to hold up to 5,000 seats for entertainment and sporting events.

Rocky Mount Mills is a craft brewery incubator, the first of its kind on North Carolina, that is now home to many up-and-coming breweries and restaurants. In addition, the mill hosts summer music festivals and other events throughout the year. It has been in the process of redevelopment since 2014 by Capitol Broadcasting Company, which also owns the popular American Tobacco campus in downtown Durham, North Carolina. Nearby are dozens of historical homes for rent in the Rocky Mount Mills Village. The next phase of development is Goat Island on the Tar River, which will offer public access to hiking trails, sandy beaches, and rafting/canoeing.

A Rocky Mount Railroad Museum has been in the planning stages for a number of years given the cultural significance of the railroad on the city—in the early to mid-1900s the Emerson Shops alone of the Atlantic Coast Line Railroad employed over 2,000 people—but is currently without a facility. It has been proposed to be located inside the train station.

National Register of Historic Places
The Bellamy-Philips House, Bellemonte, Benvenue, Edgemont Historic District, Falls Road Historic District, Lincoln Park Historic District, Machaven, The Meadows, Rocky Mount Central City Historic District, Rocky Mount Electric Power Plant, Rocky Mount Mills, Rocky Mount Mills Village Historic District, Stonewall, Villa Place Historic District, and West Haven Historic District are listed on the National Register of Historic Places.

Parks and recreation

Rocky Mount is a major center for youth traveling sports as a midpoint between New York and Florida along I-95. The Rocky Mount Sports Complex, maintained by the Parks and Recreation department, includes seven outdoor baseball fields, four softball fields, eight soccer fields, a professional disc golf course, basketball courts, and volleyball courts. The complex sees many statewide and interstate baseball and soccer tournaments. It also has a football stadium home to the NCWC Battling Bishops football team and Elizabeth City State University's annual Down East Viking Classic. The Rocky Mount Event Center administered by the city has added eight indoor basketball courts, sixteen volleyball courts, a ropes course, a climbing wall, and a family entertainment center, with plans to host indoor basketball, volleyball, and gymnastics competitions.

Tar River Trail is a  greenway running east to west along the namesake river that connects with multiple parks, city landmarks, and the sports complex, with designated boat ramps for recreational paddling trips on the river. Notable among the connected parks is City Lake Park, built in 1937 during the Great Depression by the Works Progress Administration, and the  biodiverse Battle Park centered on the falls of the Tar River.

Government

The city of Rocky Mount has a council-manager form of government. The city is divided into seven wards with a total of seven council members elected to the city council, one from each ward. Members of the city council serve four-year terms with staggered elections every two years, while the mayor is elected at-large by citizens and serves a four-year term. The mayor is ex officio chair of the city council and only votes in case of a tie. The council appoints a city manager to serve as chief administrative officer of day-to-day affairs of government. As of 2022, the current city manager is Peter Varney. Since the city straddles the Nash County-Edgecombe County border, the commissions of both counties are also involved in governance of the city.

City council
 Sandy Roberson (Mayor)
 Andre Knight (Ward 1)
 Reuben C. Blackwell, IV (Ward 2)
 Richard Joyner (Ward 3)
 T. J. Walker (Ward 4)
 Lige Daughtridge (Ward 5)
 Tom Harris (Ward 6)
 Jabaris Walker (Ward 7)

Education

North Carolina Wesleyan University is a four-year private liberal arts college located in Rocky Mount and home to the Eastern North Carolina Center for Business and Entrepreneurship. The center's programs are free, open to the public, and focusing on business development, entrepreneurship, and community engagement. The city is also served by Nash Community College, which has a brewing, distillation, and fermentation program in partnership with the Mills, and Edgecombe Community College, which has a downtown campus specializing in biotechnology and medical simulation. Shaw University's College of Adult and Professional Education, or C.A.P.E., program also has a satellite campus in the Mills Village.

The city of Rocky Mount is primarily served by the Nash-Rocky Mount Public School System, which as a whole has 15,000 students in 28 schools. Parts of the city in Edgecombe County are also served by the Edgecombe County Public Schools system. Public high schools include Nash Central High School, Northern Nash High School, Rocky Mount High School, Southwest Edgecombe High School and Southern Nash High School. The three nontraditional public schools are Tar River Academy,The Center for Industry Technology and Innovation and its sister school the Nash Rocky Mount Early College. The one local charter school is Rocky Mount Preparatory School. There are also a number of private schools in the area.

Braswell Memorial Library serves the community as its major public library with affiliated libraries throughout the Twin Counties. It recently became part of the State Library's NC Cardinal consortium of public libraries that share an integrated system allowing books and other materials to be checked out from other libraries across the state.

Media
Rocky Mount is considered part of the Raleigh-Durham-Fayetteville television and radio media market, the 25th largest in the United States. However, multiple broadcast stations in the Greenville-New Bern-Washington market also cover the city.

Locally, WHIG-TV, founded in 1997 and currently hosted out of Wesleyan College, and WNCR-LD, founded in 2002 and located in downtown, are Rocky Mount's community television stations. WRQM 90.9 FM is the repeater station of public radio station WUNC, the local NPR affiliate. In the 1990s, it was known as "Down East Radio" and also hosted out of Wesleyan College.

The Rocky Mount Telegram serves as the main daily newspaper for the city of Rocky Mount and surrounding areas.

Infrastructure

Transportation

Roads and highways

The city is served by three major highways:  
 to its west.
 (Future I-87) as its main east–west corridor.
 (Wesleyan Boulevard) as its main north–south corridor.

In the downtown area, both US 64 Bus. (Sunset Avenue / Thomas Street) and US 301 Bus. (Church Street) serve as major thoroughfares.  State highways NC 4, NC 43, NC 48 and NC 97 serve the city by connecting to nearby towns.

Airports
The Rocky Mount–Wilson Regional Airport  serves the general aviation needs of the surrounding counties. The closest airport with scheduled commercial service is Pitt–Greenville Airport (PGV),  to the southeast. Cargo and charter flights in the area also use the Kinston Regional Jetport (ISO),  to the south.

Rail

Amtrak provides three north and three southbound trains per day at the Rocky Mount station located in downtown. Service is to Washington, D.C., New York City, Miami and Philadelphia. Freight service is provided by CSX. Trains travel to destinations in eastern North Carolina and also to points west and south of the city.

Public transit
Tar River Transit provides public transportation in and around the city of Rocky Mount, and operates 10 fixed bus routes throughout the city.

Health care
Nash UNC Health Care is a nonprofit hospital affiliated with UNC Health Care, which it joined in 2014. It has 345 beds at four different locations. Its flagship facility is Nash General Hospital. When Nash General opened in 1971, it consolidated four different hospitals in the Rocky Mount area, and was the first all-private-room hospital in North Carolina. Other hospitals operated are Nash Day Hospital, Bryant T. Aldridge Rehabilitation Center, and Coastal Plain Hospital. Nash UNC has added more facilities in recent years: a Surgery Pavilion in 2004, a renovated Emergency Department and Nash Heart Center in 2014, and Nash Women's Center in 2016. In 2018, the Danny Talbott Cancer Center facility opened, named in honor of a Rocky Mount athletic legend and cancer survivor.

Notable people

 
 Andrew B. Anderson Jr. – U.S. Air Force lieutenant general and chief of staff born in Rocky Mount.
 Thurbert Baker – the first African-American Attorney General in the State of Georgia born in Rocky Mount.
 Dr. Lloyd W. Bailey - faithless elector in the 1968 Presidential election
 F. C. Barnes – Gospel musician born in Rocky Mount.
 Luther Barnes – Gospel music producer born in Rocky Mount. 
 Gardner Bishop – barber and civil rights activist born in Rocky Mount.
 Herman Boone – coach depicted by Denzel Washington in Remember the Titans born in Rocky Mount.
 Benjamin Bunn – former U.S. congressman and first mayor of Rocky Mount who lived in historic Benvenue.
 Jim Clack – NFL football player who won two Super Bowl championships with the Pittsburgh Steelers born in Rocky Mount.
 Roy Cooper – Governor of North Carolina.
 Jeff Collins – member of the North Carolina General Assembly.
 Elijah L. Daughtridge – 12th Lieutenant Governor of North Carolina born in Rocky Mount.
 Harold Denton – nuclear physicist born in Rocky Mount who advised the President during the Three Mile Island accident.
 Harold Bascom Durham Jr. – recipient of the Medal of Honor for his actions in the Vietnam War.
 Mike Easley – former governor of North Carolina and state attorney general born in Rocky Mount.
 Phil Ford – UNC and NBA basketball player born in Rocky Mount.
 Jim Gardner – former U.S. congressman and lieutenant governor who cofounded Hardee's in the city.
 Maureen Garrett – soap opera actress born in Rocky Mount.
 Alberta Gay – mother of Marvin Gaye born in Rocky Mount.
 Kaye Gibbons – novelist who attended Rocky Mount Senior High School and wrote Ellen Foster.
 Brian Goodwin – MLB baseball player for the Pittsburgh Pirates.
 Billy Godwin – former head baseball coach for East Carolina University born in Rocky Mount.
 Allan Gurganus – author who wrote Oldest Living Confederate Widow Tells All born in Rocky Mount.
 Bill Harrison – former CEO and chairman of JPMorgan Chase born in Rocky Mount.
 Chuck Hinton – MLB baseball player born in Rocky Mount.
 Matt Hill – Electric blues musician born in Rocky Mount.
 Earle Hyman – actor born in Rocky Mount who portrayed Cliff's father on The Cosby Show.
 Terrence J – actor and co-anchor of E! News lived in Rocky Mount and attended nearby Northern Nash High School.
 Jack Kerouac – father of the Beat Generation who resided with family off and on and referred to city as "Testament, Va." in On the Road.
 Kay Kyser – big band musician, radio and film personality born in Rocky Mount.
 Buck Leonard – Negro league baseball player; member of the National Baseball Hall of Fame.
 Westray Battle Long – second director of Women's Army Corps under Dwight D. Eisenhower during World War II born in Rocky Mount.
 Bill Mathis – American Football League football player who was a running back for the New York Jets
 Mae Mercer – Blues singer, actress and producer born in annexed former town of Battleboro.
 Thelonious Monk – Jazz pianist born in Rocky Mount.
 William Murray – former football player and head coach at Duke University born in Rocky Mount.
 Vann R. Newkirk II – journalist and staff writer for The Atlantic born in Rocky Mount.
 Thomas J. Pearsall - attorney, politician, and philanthropist.  He was the main instigator of the Pearsall Plan and was a co-founder of North Carolina Wesleyan College.
 Charles Pittman – NBA basketball player born in Rocky Mount.
 Chuck Robbins – CEO of Cisco Systems who attended Rocky Mount High School.
 Etaf Rum – New York Times best-selling author of A Woman is No Man who lives in Rocky Mount. 
 Susie Sharp – first female North Carolina Supreme Court justice born in Rocky Mount.
 Don Stallings - NFL football player who played for the Washington Redskins and for the University of North Carolina in college.
 The Swift – Christian pop band formed in Rocky Mount in the late 1990s.
 Danny Talbott – UNC and NFL quarterback who led Rocky Mount High School to state championships in football, basketball, and baseball.
 Ken Thompson – former CEO and chairman of Wachovia born in Rocky Mount.
 Jim Thorpe – Olympic gold medalist who played minor league baseball for the Rocky Mount Railroaders.
 Mike Tyson – MLB baseball player born in Rocky Mount.
 Phil Valentine – talk show radio host was born in Rocky Mount but grew up in nearby Nashville.
 Tim Valentine – former U.S. congressman born in Rocky Mount.
 Harold Vick – Jazz musician known for his work in the film School Daze (1988) born in Rocky Mount.
 Buck Williams – NBA basketball player born in Rocky Mount.
 Mary Elizabeth Winstead – Emmy Award winning actress born in Rocky Mount.
 Adrian H. Wood – educator and blogger who was born and raised in Rocky Mount.

See also 

 List of municipalities in North Carolina
 Rocky Mount Pines, a former minor-league baseball team of the Carolina League.
 List of U.S. communities with African-American majority populations

References

External links

 
 

 
Populated places established in 1816
Cities in North Carolina
Cities in Nash County, North Carolina
Cities in Edgecombe County, North Carolina
1816 establishments in North Carolina